The Collaboration on Energy and Environmental Markets (CEEM), formerly known as the Centre for Energy and Environmental Markets, at the University of New South Wales conducts interdisciplinary research into energy and environmental markets and associated policies. CEEM brings together researchers from the areas of Business, Engineering and Social Sciences.  In addition to undertaking research, CEEM hosts short courses and seminars and participates in conferences in Australia and internationally. The Centre also contributes to undergraduate teaching and to supervision of postgraduate students.

See also
Renewable energy commercialisation in Australia
Mark Diesendorf
Greenhouse Solutions with Sustainable Energy

References

Energy economics
Energy policy
Energy policy of Australia
Energy in New South Wales